The following outline is provided as an overview of and topical guide to bipolar disorder:

Bipolar disorder – mental disorder with periods of depression and periods of elevated mood. The elevated mood is significant and is known as mania or hypomania, depending on its severity, or whether symptoms of psychosis are present. During mania, an individual behaves or feels abnormally energetic, happy, or irritable. Individuals often make poorly thought out decisions with little regard to the consequences. The need for sleep is usually reduced during manic phases. During periods of depression, there may be crying, a negative outlook on life, and poor eye contact with others. The risk of suicide among those with the illness is high at greater than 6 percent over 20 years, while self-harm occurs in 30–40 percent. Other mental health issues such as anxiety disorders and substance use disorder are commonly associated. Also known as manic depression.

What type of thing is bipolar disorder? 

Bipolar disorder can be described as all of the following:

 Disorder –
 Mental disorder – functional abnormality or disturbance characterized by a behavioral or mental pattern that may cause suffering or a poor ability to function in life. Such features may be persistent, relapsing and remitting, or occur as a single episode.

Bipolar spectrum 

Bipolar spectrum –
 Bipolar I – bipolar disorder with at least one manic episode (with or without psychosis), possibly with hypomanic and/or depressive episodes as well
 Bipolar II – bipolar disorder with at least one depressive and at least one hypomanic episode, without any full mania
 Cyclothymia – "mild" bipolar disorder, with symptoms of hypomania and depression not severe enough to be classified as bipolar I or II
 Dysthymia – akin to depression, with symptoms that are long-lasting but less severe
 Major depressive disorder – a mood disorder involving low mood, low energy, poor self-esteem, lack of interest in enjoyable activities, and/or aches and pains
 Schizoaffective disorder – mood swings combined with psychosis; has subtypes bipolar type and depressive type
 Mania – a state of hyperactivity, heightened mood (euphoric or irritable), low sleep, pressured speech, grandiosity, and/or racing thoughts; may include psychotic features like delusions or hallucinations
 Mixed affective state – a state with traits of both mania and depression (e.g. irritability, low mood, suicidality, and racing thoughts at the same time)
 Hypomania – a state of high mood similar to that of mania but less severe
 Major depressive episode – an episode with signs of major depressive disorder

Symptoms of bipolar disorder 

 Anxiety – a state of increased stress and worry
 Emotional dysregulation – difficulty regulating one's mood, resulting in mood swings
 Sleep disorder – disordered sleeping habits

Signs typical of mania 
 Delusion – fixed belief that cannot be changed despite reason or evidence, not explained by common cultural beliefs
 Hallucination – perceiving something that is not actually present
 Insomnia – difficulty falling and/or staying asleep
 Pressured speech – rapid, erratic, and/or frenzied speech that can be difficult for others to understand and interrupt
 Psychosis – inability to distinguish between reality and fantasy
 Racing thoughts – rapid thinking, sometimes experienced as distracting or distressing

Signs typical of depression 
 Anhedonia – reduced ability to experience pleasure
 Dysphoria – a state of profound unhappiness or discomfort
 Hypersomnia – excessive sleeping and/or sleepiness
 Self harm – causing intentional pain or injury to the body, often as self-punishment or emotional release
 Suicidal ideation – considering committing suicide

Treatment of bipolar disorder 

 Treatment of bipolar disorder –
 Treatment of bipolar disorder – Mood stabilizers – medication that reduces mood swings and allows the user to experience a more typical range of moods
 Anticonvulsants –
 Carbamazepine –
 Gabapentin –
 Lamotrigine (Lamictal) –
 Oxcarbazepine –
 Topiramate –
 Valproic acid –
 Sodium valproate –
 Valproate semisodium –
 Lithium pharmacology –
 Lithium carbonate –
 Lithium citrate –
 Lithium sulfate –
 Antipsychotics –
 Treatment of bipolar disorder – Anxiety –
 Alprazolam (Solanax and Xanax) –
 List of benzodiazepines –

Non-pharmaceutical treatment of bipolar disorder 
 Clinical psychology –
 Electroconvulsive therapy –
 Involuntary commitment –
 Light therapy –
 Psychotherapy –
 Transcranial magnetic stimulation –

History of bipolar disorder 

History of bipolar disorder –
 Emil Kraepelin –
 Karl Leonhard –
 John Cade –
 Mogens Schou –
 Frederick K. Goodwin –
 Kay Redfield Jamison –

Organisations 
 International Society for Bipolar Disorders –
 Icarus Project –
Bipolar UK

See also 
 Affective spectrum – spectrum of mood disorders, including disorders that impact other areas in addition to mood (e.g. ADHD and migraines)
 List of people with bipolar disorder –
 Bipolar disorder in children – pediatric bipolar disorder, which sometimes involves more rapid shifting and mixed states

References

External links 

 Bipolar Disorder overview from the U.S. National Institute of Mental Health website
 NICE Bipolar Disorder clinical guidelines from the U.K. National Institute for Health and Clinical Excellence website

Bipolar disorder
Bipolar disorder